Cdiscount is the third largest (behind amazon.fr and veepee.fr) French e-commerce website with products such as electronics, household appliances and food.

In 2013, Cdiscount was the most important French e-commerce website in terms of turnover with a growth superior to the market’s average in 2013.

Cdiscount operates in 6 countries: France, Belgium, Germany, Spain, Italy and Luxembourg.

History 

Founded in December 1998 by three brothers, Hervé, Christophe and Nicolas Charle, Cdiscount has been a subsidiary of Casino Group since February 2000. In September 2008 Casino Group increased both its direct and indirect participation to 79,6% of the capital and adopted a new structure with a board constituted of Casino founders and representatives.

In January 2011, Casino Group bought the Charle brothers’ shares and now possess 99.6% of the capital.

In October 2014, Cdiscount continues its internationalization with the opening of cdiscount.com.br in Brazil, with the support of Cnova Brasil.

Operations 

Cdiscount.com is an online retailer for goods and services. Its range is structured around 40 stores organized in categories: cultural goods, high-tech, IT, household appliances, and personal appliances (games, toys…). In order to grow further Cdiscount has incorporated high-potential goods and services under their banner (financing, insurance, travel, wine, mobile phone subscription…).

In 2006 Cdiscount opened a pilot physical store in Le Bouscat near Bordeaux (France) that utilises sales data from the websites to select only the best-selling products. This store also acted as a delivery point for small packages.

A second store opened up in 2011 in Paris’s 7th district, Rue du Bac. This store displays the bestsellers from the website in every category, totalling over 2000 products across high-tech, IT, appliances, toys, DVDs, video games, and wines and spirits.

The company being based in Bordeaux (region of Gironde), products are stocked in the area in the logistics site of Cestas Pot au Pin.

Distribution strategy 

Since the involvement of Casino Group with Cdiscount the distribution strategy has evolved and now incorporates the Casino Group stores. New delivery points dedicated to Cdiscount are being built in the Casino stores.

 June 2010: Integration in “Petit Casino” stores for packages that weigh less than 30 kg
 Late 2010: Every store integrated
 2011 1st semester: all of the mini supermarkets retail network integrated
 October 2011: Cdiscount opens a store in Paris (Rue du Bac, 7th District)

References

External links
 Official website

Cnova
Online retailers of France
Retail companies established in 1998
Internet properties established in 1998
1998 establishments in France
Companies based in Bordeaux